Ricardo Gutierrez is a Mexican American actor, director, and teacher. He had a recurring role as Alderman Mata on the first season of the Starz Network drama series Boss.

Education
Gutierrez studied at Illinois State University.

Career

Theater
Gutierrez has acted in performances at The Goodman Theatre, Steppenwolf Theatre, Victory Gardens Theater, Lookingglass Theatre Company, and Denver Center Theater.  He is the former artistic director of Glass Onion Theater, Nosotros Theatre Company in Los Angeles and the Canterbury Theatre in Indiana. He was the co-artistic director of Teatro Vista, a Latino theater company in Chicago, from August 2012 (a transition period for retiring founder Edward Torres), then sole artistic director from March 2013 to September 2020.

His directorial projects include How Long Will I Cry?: Voices of Youth Violence at Steppenwolf Theater, Quiara Alegría Hudes's The Happiest Song Plays Last at the Goodman Theatre, and Kenny D'Aquila's Unorganized Crime at the Teatro Vista.

Television
Gutierrez has appeared in various television shows including Hill Street Blues, Knots Landing, Max Headroom, Hunter, and Wiseguy. In 2012 he starred as Alderman Lalo Mata on the Starz Network original drama series Boss.

Personal life
Gutierrez was previously married to actress Judith Ivey.

Filmography

Film

Television

References

External links
 
 Ricardo Gutierrez at the Turner Classics Movie Database

Living people
American male film actors
American male actors of Mexican descent
American male stage actors
American male television actors
American theatre directors
Artistic directors
Hispanic and Latino American male actors
Male actors from Chicago
Illinois State University alumni
1955 births